Parliamentary elections were held in Finland on 19 March 1995.

The Social Democratic Party (SDP) achieved the best result of any party since World War II, winning 63 of the 200 seats in the Eduskunta and defeating the incumbent centre-right coalition led by the Centre Party. The result was attributed to the government's unpopular austerity policies as well as lingering effects of the early 1990s recession.

After the election, a five party "Rainbow Coalition" was formed, between the SDP, National Coalition Party, Left Alliance, Swedish People's Party and the Green League, with SDP leader Paavo Lipponen appointed Prime Minister.

Results

By province

References

General elections in Finland
Finland
Parliament
Finland
Election and referendum articles with incomplete results